Henry Miller (July 21, 1827 – October 14, 1916) was a German-American rancher known as the "Cattle King of California" who at one point in the late 19th century was one of the largest land-owners in the United States.

Life and work
Born in Brackenheim, Germany as Heinrich Alfred Kreiser, he emigrated to New York City in 1846, where he worked as a butcher. He came out to California in 1850 under the name Henry Miller, a name borrowed from the non-transferable steamer ticket he had purchased from a friend in New York.

Miller built up a thriving butcher business in San Francisco, later going into partnership with Charles Lux, also a German immigrant and a former competitor, in 1858.

Miller purchased most of the Spanish land grants lying between San Francisco and the San Joaquin for about $1.15 per acre, ranged his cattle over the area and eventually forced the land grant heirs to sell out to him at his price.  He also "kept the local officials, particularly the county assessors, in his debt.".  The Miller and Lux Corporation was headquartered in Los Banos, on the west side of the San Joaquin Valley. Miller played a major role in the development of much of the San Joaquin Valley during the late 19th century and early 20th century. His role in maintaining and managing his corporate farming empire illustrates the growing trend of industrial barons during the Gilded Age. This detailed correspondence with Superintendent Turner reflects his micromanagement business style and underscores the lack of autonomy of rural farmers in the region. Miller persistently corresponded with his subordinates in order to verify that all the cattle met his standards before being sold. The correspondences demonstrate his attention to detail, especially in regards to the weather conditions and the amount of food and water the ranches contained. In 1910, his upstream water rights to the San Joaquin River, which crossed much of the company's land, were acquired by the Big Creek Hydroelectric Project; the project's planned reservoir storage of snowmelt would greatly reduce flooding and increase river flow during the dry season.

The Miller and Lux Corporation did not long survive his death, though his grandson George Nickel reorganized the holdings and became a large farmer and land developer. Some of his descendants continue to farm in the area around Los Banos and to operate as farmers and land developers in Bakersfield and Kern County. Miller's contemporary descendants include Wiley Nickel, an American politician serving as a member of the U.S House of Representatives from North Carolina’s 13th congressional district and Tucker Carlson, who is a descendant of Miller through his birth mother, Lisa McNear Lombardi.

References

External links
 Monterey County Historical Society: The California Cattle Boom, 1849-1862
 Oregon History Project: Henry Miller, cattleman (photograph) 
 Oregon History Project: Henry Miller, Cattleman (narrative)
 Article on Miller family history
 Guide to the Miller & Lux Records at The Bancroft Library
 Henry Miller letter, NC498. University of Nevada, Reno, Special Collections Department.

Further reading

 
 
 Treadwell, Edward F. (2005) The Cattle King: A Dramatized Biography of Henry Miller, Founder of the Miller and Lux Cattle Empire. Great West Books.

1827 births
1916 deaths
Land owners from California
Ranchers from California
German expatriates in the United States
German emigrants to the United States
People from Los Banos, California
19th-century American businesspeople
Burials at Woodlawn Memorial Park Cemetery (Colma, California)